Richard Carrier (July 19, 1674 – November 17, 1749) was a witness during the 1692 Salem witch trials who needed to testify against his mother.

Early life 
Carrier was born in 1674 to Martha Carrier (1643–1692) and Thomas Carrier (1630–1739) in Billerica. He was the second oldest of 8 children and had three sisters and two brothers. He moved to Andover with his family and survived a smallpox outbreak in 1690 which his family was accused of causing.

Salem witch trials 
When Carrier was 18 years old in 1692, he was arrested together with his family on accusation of witchcraft on May 28, 1692. During his mother's trial, Carrier and his 7-year-old sister Sarah testified against their mother on the accusation of witchcraft. He, however, was tortured before his testimony by hanging him by his heels "until the blood was ready to come out of his nose" or until he said what his interrogators wanted to hear. His mother was convicted and executed on August 19, 1692, and Richard Carrier and his family were set free again.

In 1711, Carrier and his family received a small amount of recompense from the Massachusetts government for her conviction: 7 pounds and 6 shillings.

Later life 
Carrier went on to marry Elizabeth Sessions on July 18, 1694, in Andover and had six children with her:
 Elizabeth Carrier (1695–1723)
 John Carrier (1695–1739)
 Timothy Carrier (1705–1781)
 Sarah Carrier (1701–1717)
 Mehitable Carrier (1698–1750)
 Martha Carrier (1702–1769)

After Elizabeth's death, Carrier went on to marry Thankful Brown on July 29, 17077, in Colchester and had four children with her:
 Hannah Carrier (1709–1741)
 Thankful Carrier (1708–1704)
 Remembrance Carrier (born 1703)
 Amos Carrier (1704–1730)

Carrier led the rest of his life in Colchester until he died on November 17, 1749. He was buried in Colchester Burying Ground.

See also 
 Salem witch trials
 List of people of the Salem witch trials

References

1674 births
1749 deaths
People accused of witchcraft
People of the Salem witch trials